Alex Sylvester Lindsay  (28 May 1919 – 5 December 1974) was a New Zealand violinist, conductor and orchestra leader. He was born in Invercargill, New Zealand, on 28 May 1919.

In the 1959 New Year Honours, Lindsay was appointed a Member of the Order of the British Empire, for services to music, especially orchestral work.

References

1919 births
1974 deaths
New Zealand violinists
Male violinists
New Zealand conductors (music)
Male conductors (music)
People from Invercargill
20th-century violinists
20th-century conductors (music)
20th-century male musicians
New Zealand Members of the Order of the British Empire
Burials at Eastern Cemetery, Invercargill